Ceryx flavigutta is a moth of the subfamily Arctiinae. It was described by Gustaaf Hulstaert in 1924. It is found on New Guinea.

References

Ceryx (moth)
Moths described in 1924